Hugh King may refer to:

 Hugh King (Medal of Honor) (1845–?), United States Navy sailor and Medal of Honor recipient

See also
 Hugh F. Locke King, British entrepreneur